David Scott Veres (born October 19, 1966) is an American former professional baseball player who pitched in Major League Baseball from 1994 to 2003.

Career
On January 4, 2007, Veres signed a minor league deal with the Colorado Rockies. However, he was released after appearing in just five games for their Triple-A affiliate in Colorado Springs. In 2008, Veres pitched for the York Revolution of the independent Atlantic League.

Veres played in the 1978 Little League World Series, as a member of the Torrejón Air Base team.

References

External links

Retrosheet
The Baseball Gauge
Venezuela Winter League

1966 births
Living people
Albuquerque Dukes players
American expatriate baseball players in Canada
American expatriate baseball players in Mexico
Baseball players from Montgomery, Alabama
Chicago Cubs players
Colorado Rockies players
Colorado Springs Sky Sox players
Fresno Grizzlies players
Houston Astros players
Huntsville Stars players
Iowa Cubs players
Leones del Caracas players
American expatriate baseball players in Venezuela
Major League Baseball pitchers
Medford A's players
Mexican League baseball pitchers
Modesto A's players
Montreal Expos players
Mt. Hood Community College alumni
Mt. Hood Saints baseball players
St. Louis Cardinals players
Tacoma Tigers players
Tigres del México players
Tucson Toros players
York Revolution players